Benimantell is a Valencian town and municipality located in the comarca of Marina Baixa, in the province of Alicante, Spain. Benimantell has an area of 37.9 km2 and, according to the 2002 census, a total population of 378 inhabitants. The economy of Benimantell is exclusively based on agriculture (almonds and olives). The most important monument in the town is the Catholic church of Sant Vicent Màrtir, with a hexagonal tower.

References

Municipalities in the Province of Alicante
Marina Baixa